Otter Creek Bridge is a historic structure located northwest of Oelwein, Iowa, United States. In July 1917, the Fayette County Board of Supervisors choose this bridge design for a concrete through girder bridge from the Iowa State Highway Commission, and put the project out to bid. When no one bid on the job they decided to use day laborers to build the bridge. It was completed later in 1917 for $5,153.88. The bridge was listed on the National Register of Historic Places in 1998.

See also

References

Bridges completed in 1917
Bridges in Fayette County, Iowa
National Register of Historic Places in Fayette County, Iowa
Road bridges on the National Register of Historic Places in Iowa
Concrete bridges in the United States
Girder bridges in the United States